This is a list of songs by Blanche Merrill. In all cases she wrote the lyrics, so there is no separate column for lyricist.  In a handful of cases she also composed the music although most of the time music was composed by others, often by Leo Edwards. In some cases the credit is listed as "words and music by Blanche Merrill and ..." this phraseology has been incorporated into the appropriate cell.

For published songs, the source of information is the publication itself.  For unpublished songs, the source of information the song's mention in reviews, or the Library of Congress's Catalog of Copyright Entries.

The majority of Merrill's unpublished songs are probably lost, although copies could exist in the archives of the various performers for whom she wrote.  The Library of Congress's copyright deposit would also have copies of songs which she copyrighted but never published.

Notes

Merrill, Blanche